Unione Sportiva Dilettantistica 1913 Seregno Calcio is an Italian association football club located in Seregno, Lombardy.

History 
Seregno was founded in 1913 by cav. Umberto Trabattoni and in 1936 gave hospitality to Italy National Team before world football competition.

They played Serie B in 1933–34 and 1933–35, and have not played at professional level since their relegation in the 1981–82 Serie C2 season.

In 2008 the club was renamed with the current name.

In the 2020–21 Serie D season, Seregno won the Girone B group and thus ensured themselves promotion to Serie C and return to the professional level of Italian football for the first time since 1982.

Colors and badge 
The team's color is all-blue.

Current squad

References

External links
Official homepage

 
Football clubs in Italy
Football clubs in Lombardy
Association football clubs established in 1913
Serie B clubs
Serie C clubs
1913 establishments in Italy